The Bridal Veil Falls is the smallest of the three waterfalls that make up Niagara Falls. It is located on the American side (in New York State); Luna Island separates it from the American Falls and Goat Island separates it from the Horseshoe Falls.

The Cave of the Winds attraction allows visitors to walk up to the base of Bridal Veil Falls. A pedestrian bridge crosses from Goat Island to Luna Island several yards (meters) upstream from the crest of the falls.

The waterfall has also been known in the past as Luna Falls and Iris Falls.

Gallery

References

External links

 Historic and Current images of Bridal Veil Falls Niagara Falls Public Library (Ont.)
 Live stream of Bridal Veil Falls Niagara Falls Live Stream

Niagara Falls
Waterfalls of New York (state)
Protected areas of Niagara County, New York
Plunge waterfalls
Niagara Falls State Park
Landforms of Niagara County, New York

nl:Niagarawatervallen#Bridal Veil Falls